Francisco Javier González-Acuña (nickname "Fico") is a mathematician in the UNAM's institute of mathematics and CIMAT, specializing in low-dimensional topology.

Education
He did his graduate studies at Princeton University, obtaining his Ph.D. in 1970. His thesis, written under the supervision of Ralph Fox, was titled On homology spheres.

Research
An early result of González-Acuña is that a group G is the homomorphic image of some knot group if and only if G is finitely generated and has weight at most one. This result  (a "remarkable theorem", as  Lee Neuwirth called it in his review),
was published in 1975 in Annals of Mathematics.  In 1978, together with José María Montesinos, he answered a question posed by Fox, proving the existence of 2-knots whose groups have infinitely many ends.

With Hamish Short, González-Acuña proposed and worked on the cabling conjecture: the only knots in the 3-sphere which admit a reducible Dehn surgery, i.e. a surgery which results in a reducible 3-manifold, are the cable knots.

See also
CIMAT
UNAM

Selected publications
González-Acuña, F., Homomorphs of knot groups, Annals of Mathematics (2) 102 (1975), no. 2, 37–377.   
González-Acuña, F., Montesinos, José M., Ends of knot groups,  Annals of Mathematics (2) 108  (1978), no. 1, 91–96.  
González-Acuña, F.,  Short, Hamish, Knot surgery and primeness. Math. Proc. Cambridge Philos. Soc. 99 (1986), no. 1, 89–102. 
J.C. Gómez-Larrañaga, F.J. González-Acuña, J. Hoste. Minimal Atlases on 3-manifolds, Math. Proc. Camb. Phil. Soc. 109 (1991), 105–115.

References

External links
 portrait

 Unsolvability of word problems with knot groups, at arXiv-2010 and L'Enseignement Mathematique.
 https://www.cimat.mx/es/node/590
 https://escueladenudos.matem.unam.mx/
https://www.smm.org.mx/noticia/121/escuela-fico-gonzalez-acuna-de-nudos-y-3-variedades

Living people
Year of birth missing (living people)
20th-century Mexican mathematicians
21st-century  Mexican mathematicians
Princeton University alumni
Topologists
Academic staff of the National Autonomous University of Mexico